GLH Hotels Management (UK) Limited (branded glh.) is a British-based global hotel company, headquartered in London, and subsidiary of GL Limited.

GLH is the largest owner-operator hotel management company in London with over 5,000 hotel rooms. The brandname is an abbreviation of "Great London Hospitality". 

glh Hotels operates 4 hotel brands: Guoman, The Clermont, Thistle, Thistle Express, and Hard Rock. The Thistle brand operates nine hotels with seven in central London, one at London Heathrow and one in Poole. Guoman has four hotels under its collective branding: the 5-star Royal Horseguards Hotel, the Tower Hotel, Amba Hotel Marble Arch and The Cumberland Hotel all located in London. The Clermont consists of The Clermont Charing Cross and The Clermont Victoria.

History 
On 11 June 2013, GLH announced its new global owner-operator strategy focusing on the 100 global cities with a 10-year ambition to become "the world’s best managed hospitality company", delivering "the best guest centred experience in the industry". According to their press release, they would launch three new brands within the following 12 months. Prior to the relaunch in June 2013, GLH operated under the name Guoman Hotel Management (UK) Limited.

On 23 October 2013, GLH launched Amba, a global 4-star hotel brand catering to “the discerning business and leisure traveller”. The first four Amba hotels were expected to be located in London with a total of 2,088 rooms available in 2015. The four launch properties announced by GLH are situated in Marble Arch, Tower Bridge, Charing Cross and Buckingham Palace Road in London. The Grosvenor Hotel on Buckingham Palace Road will be the first to open in June 2014. GLH also announced its plans to open the Amba brand across 30 UK cities and expand internationally in China, the USA and Europe.

Halfway through 2021 the Amba-hotels were rebranded to "The Clermont". As a result, former Amba Hotel Charing Cross and Grosvenor would continue as The Clermont Charing Cross and The Clermont Victoria. 

The company is owned by GL Limited, an international investment company headquartered in Singapore renamed from BIL International Limited, and has a primary listing on the Singapore Exchange, with secondary listings on the London and New Zealand Stock Exchanges. The company's primary role is as an active investor with strategic shareholdings and active investment management.

References

External links
 

Hotel and leisure companies based in London
Hotel chains in the United Kingdom
Companies based in the London Borough of Hillingdon